This list is of Major Sites Protected for their Historical and Cultural Value at the National Level in the Municipality of Shanghai, People's Republic of China.

 

|}

As well as sites protected at the national level there are 238 sites in Shanghai that are protected at the municipal level (see 上海市文物保护单位).

See also

 Principles for the Conservation of Heritage Sites in China
 List of historic buildings in Shanghai

References

Shanghai-related lists
Shanghai